The 1964 Ole Miss Rebels baseball team represented the University of Mississippi in the 1964 NCAA University Division baseball season. The Rebels played their home games at Swayze Field. The team was coached by Tom Swayze in his 13th year as head coach at Ole Miss.

The Rebels won the District III to advance to the College World Series, where they were defeated by the Arizona State Sun Devils.

Roster

Schedule

! style="" | Regular Season
|- valign="top" 

|- align="center" bgcolor="#ccffcc"
| 1 || March 27 ||  || Swayze Field • Oxford, Mississippi || 5–1 || 1–0 || –
|- align="center" bgcolor="#ccffcc"
| 2 || March 28 || Illinois Wesleyan || Swayze Field • Oxford, Mississippi || 5–1 || 2–0 || –
|- align="center" bgcolor="#ffcccc"
| 3 || March 30 || at  || Unknown • Hattiesburg, Mississippi || 0–2 || 2–1 || –
|- align="center" bgcolor="#ccffcc"
| 4 || March 31 || vs Southern Mississippi || Rahaim Park • Laurel, Mississippi || 10–2 || 3–1 || –
|-

|-
! style="" | Postseason
|- valign="top" 

|- align="center" bgcolor="#ffcccc"
| 5 || April 1 || at  || Alumni Field • Hammond, Louisiana || 9–10 || 3–2 || –
|- align="center" bgcolor="#ccffcc"
| 6 || April 2 || at Southeastern Louisiana || Alumni Field • Hammond, Louisiana || 7–1 || 4–2 || –
|- align="center" bgcolor="#ccffcc"
| 7 || April 3 || at  || Tulane Diamond • New Orleans, Louisiana || 9–0 || 5–2 || 1–0
|- align="center" bgcolor="#ccffcc"
| 8 || April 4 || at Tulane || Tulane Diamond • New Orleans, Louisiana || 12–10 || 6–2 || 2–0
|- align="center" bgcolor="#ccffcc"
| 9 || April 7 || at  || Alex Box Stadium • Baton Rouge, Louisiana || 4–3 || 7–2 || 3–0
|- align="center" bgcolor="#ccffcc"
| 10 || April 7 || LSU || Swayze Field • Oxford, Mississippi || 11–0 || 8–2 || 4–0
|- align="center" bgcolor="#ccffcc"
| 11 || April 10 || at  || Sewell–Thomas Stadium • Tuscaloosa, Alabama || 9–5 || 9–2 || 5–0
|- align="center" bgcolor="#ccffcc"
| 12 || April 11 || at Alabama || Sewell–Thomas Stadium • Tuscaloosa, Alabama || 14–2 || 10–2 || 6–0
|- align="center" bgcolor="#ccffcc"
| 13 || April 14 ||  || Swayze Field • Oxford, Mississippi || 9–6 || 11–2 || 6–0
|- align="center" bgcolor="#ccffcc"
| 14 || April 15 || Delta State || Swayze Field • Oxford, Mississippi || 7–6 || 12–2 || 6–0
|- align="center" bgcolor="#ccffcc"
| 15 || April 17 || Tulane || Swayze Field • Oxford, Mississippi || 8–1 || 13–2 || 7–0
|- align="center" bgcolor="#ccffcc"
| 16 || April 18 || Tulane || Sewell–Thomas Stadium • Tuscaloosa, Alabama || 12–3 || 14–2 || 8–0
|- align="center" bgcolor="#ccffcc"
| 17 || April 20 || at  || Unknown • Starkville, Mississippi || 7–5 || 15–2 || 9–0
|- align="center" bgcolor="#ccffcc"
| 18 || April 21 || at Mississippi State || Swayze Field • Starkville, Mississippi || 8–0 || 16–2 || 10–0
|- align="center" bgcolor="#ccffcc"
| 19 || April 29 ||  || Swayze Field • Oxford, Mississippi || 15–1 || 17–2 || 10–0
|-

|- align="center" bgcolor="#ccffcc"
| 20 || May 1 || Alabama || Swayze Field • Oxford, Mississippi || 6–0 || 18–2 || 11–0
|- align="center" bgcolor="#ffcccc"
| 21 || May 4 || at  || Ray E. Didier Field • Thibodaux, Louisiana || 2–5 || 18–3 || 11–0
|- align="center" bgcolor="#ccffcc"
| 22 || May 5 || at Nicholls State || Ray E. Didier Field • Thibodaux, Louisiana || 8–0 || 19–3 || 11–0
|- align="center" bgcolor="#ffcccc"
| 23 || May 8 || Mississippi State || Unknown • Starkville, Mississippi || 2–5 || 19–4 || 11–1
|-

|-
! style="" | Postseason
|- valign="top" 

|- align="center" bgcolor="#ffcccc"
| 24 || May 13 || at  || Plainsman Park • Auburn, Alabama || 3–8 || 19–5 || 11–1
|- align="center" bgcolor="#ccffcc"
| 25 || May 15 || Auburn || Sawyze Field • Oxford, Mississippi || 7–0 || 20–5 || 11–1
|- align="center" bgcolor="#ccffcc"
| 26 || May 17 || Auburn || Sawyze Field • Oxford, Mississippi || 5–0 || 21–5 || 11–1
|-

|- align="center" bgcolor="#ccffcc"
| 27 || May 28 || vs  || Sims Legion Park • Gastonia, North Carolina || 11–0 || 22–5 || 11–1
|- align="center" bgcolor="#ccffcc"
| 28 || May 28 || vs  || Sims Legion Park • Gastonia, North Carolina || 4–3 || 23–5 || 11–1
|- align="center" bgcolor="#ccffcc"
| 29 || May 30 || vs North Carolina || Sims Legion Park • Gastonia, North Carolina || 13–1 || 24–5 || 11–1
|-

|- align="center" bgcolor="#ffcccc"
| 30 || June 9 || vs Southern California || Omaha Municipal Stadium • Omaha, Nebraska || 2–3 || 24–6 || 11–1
|- align="center" bgcolor="#ffcccc"
| 31 || June 10 || vs Arizona State || Omaha Municipal Stadium • Omaha, Nebraska || 0–5 || 24–7 || 11–1
|-

Awards and honors 
Don Kessinger
All-SEC
All-SEC Western Division
All-District III Team
First Team All-America American Baseball Coaches Association
First Team All-America The Sporting News

Tommy Keyes
All-SEC
All-SEC Western Division

Glenn Lusk
All-SEC
All-SEC Western Division

Rich Prine
All-SEC
All-SEC Western Division

Fred Roberts
All-SEC Western Division

Billy Sumrall
All-SEC Western Division

References

Ole Miss Rebels baseball seasons
Ole Miss Rebels baseball
College World Series seasons
Ole Miss
Southeastern Conference baseball champion seasons